The purpose of a system is what it does (POSIWID) is a systems thinking heuristic coined by Stafford Beer, who observed that there is "no point in claiming that the purpose of a system is to do what it constantly fails to do." The term is widely used by systems theorists, and is generally invoked to counter the notion that the purpose of a system can be read from the intentions of those who design, operate, or promote it. When a system's side effects or unintended consequences reveal that its behavior is poorly understood, then the POSIWID perspective can balance political understandings of system behavior with a more straightforwardly descriptive view.

Origins of the term
Stafford Beer coined the term POSIWID and used it many times in public addresses. In his address to the University of Valladolid, Spain, in October 2001, he said:

Uses
From a cybernetic perspective, complex systems are not controllable by simple notions of management, and interventions in a system can best be understood by looking at how they affect observed system behavior. The term is used in many other fields as well, including biology and management. Whereas a cybernetician may apply the principle to the results inexorably produced by the mechanical dynamics of an activity system, a management scientist may apply it to the results produced by the self-interest of actors who play roles in a business or other institution.

See also
 Duck test
 The proof of the pudding is in the eating (Wiktionary)
What is Cybernetics? Conference by Stafford Beer (video recording)

References

Heuristics
Systems theory
Systems thinking
Teleology
2001 introductions